Robert A. Lanier (born July 24, 1968) is an American college basketball coach for the SMU Mustangs. He previously served as the head coach at Georgia State from 2019 to 2022 and Siena from 2001 to 2005.

Playing career
Lanier played his college basketball at St. Bonaventure, where he scored 868 career points and was named to the Atlantic 10 Conference All-Freshman Team.

Coaching career
Lanier's first coaching stop was at Niagara as an assistant for two seasons before moving back to an assistant coaching spot at his alma mater. After a two-year stop at Rutgers, Lanier joined Rick Barnes's staff at Texas. In 2001, he was hired for his first head coaching job at Siena where in his first season at the helm, he guided the Saints to a MAAC conference tournament championship and spot in the 2002 NCAA tournament where they defeated Alcorn State in the opening round, and lost to eventual national champion Maryland in the first round. He'd also lead Siena to a 2003 NIT appearance where the Saints advanced to the third round with wins over Western Michigan and Villanova. After four seasons and a 58–70 record, Lanier was fired by Siena.

Lanier would join the coaching staffs at Virginia and Florida before reuniting with Barnes at both Texas and Tennessee. On April 5, 2019 Lanier was named the head coach at Georgia State, replacing Ron Hunter who accepted the head coaching position at Tulane. 

Coach Lanier went 53-30 in 3 seasons at Georgia State until he accepted the head coach position at SMU on March 27, 2022.

Personal
Lanier is the cousin of former NBA player and Naismith Memorial Basketball Hall of Fame member Bob Lanier. Lanier's son Emory plays basketball for Southern Methodist University.

Head coaching record

References

1968 births
Living people
American men's basketball coaches
American men's basketball players
Basketball coaches from New York (state)
Basketball players from New York City
College men's basketball head coaches in the United States
Florida Gators men's basketball coaches
Georgia State Panthers men's basketball coaches
Niagara Purple Eagles men's basketball coaches
Rutgers Scarlet Knights men's basketball coaches
Siena Saints men's basketball coaches
St. Bonaventure Bonnies men's basketball coaches
St. Bonaventure Bonnies men's basketball players
Tennessee Volunteers basketball coaches
Texas Longhorns men's basketball coaches
Virginia Cavaliers men's basketball coaches